Lillicoa is a genus of fungi in the family Stictidaceae. It has four species. The genus was circumscribed by mycologist Martha Sherwood in 1977, with Lillicoa palicoureae assigned as the type species.

Species
Lillicoa bicolor 
Lillicoa palicoureae 
Lillicoa speciosa 
Lillicoa thaxteri

References

Ostropales
Ostropales genera
Taxa described in 1977